Chilakapalem is a village in Etcherla mandal, located in Srikakulam district of the Indian state of Andhra Pradesh.

References 

Villages in Srikakulam district